Førde Idrettslag is a Norwegian sports club based in Førde, Sunnfjord. It has sections for alpine skiing, association football, athletics, biathlon, cross-country skiing, floorball, gymnastics, handball, orienteering, powerlifting, ski jumping, swimming and weightlifting. The club was founded by Nikolai Schei on 4 January 1920.

Football
The football section, Førde IL Fotball, was founded on 17 November 1945. The men's football team currently plays in the Norwegian Third Division. They play their home games at Førde Stadion which has a capacity of 2,000 spectators. In 2016, Førde knocked Brann out of the Norwegian Cup. It was the first time since 1939 that Brann got knocked out in the first round. Notable former players include Vegar Gjermundstad, Kristian Fardal Opseth, Thor Jørgen Spurkeland and Alexander Ødegaard.

Recent seasons

Source:

References

Multi-sport clubs in Norway
Football clubs in Norway
Athletics clubs in Norway
Sport in Sogn og Fjordane
1920 establishments in Norway
Association football clubs established in 1945